Distributed cognition is an approach to cognitive science research that was developed by cognitive anthropologist Edwin Hutchins during the 1990s.

From cognitive ethnography, Hutchins argues that mental representations, which classical cognitive science held that are within the individual brain, are actually distributed in sociocultural systems that constitute the tools to think and perceive the world. Thus, a native of the Carolina Islands can perceive the sky and organize his perceptions of the constellations typical of his culture (the groupings of stars are different than in the traditional constellations of the West) and use the position of the stars in the sky as a map to orient himself in space while sailing overnight in a canoe.

According to Hutchins, cognition involves not only the brain but also external artifacts, work teams made up of several people, and cultural systems for interpreting reality (mythical, scientific, or otherwise).

Distributed cognition theory is part of the interdisciplinary field of embodied cognitive science, also called embodied cognition.

Hutchins' distributed cognition theory influenced philosopher Andy Clark, who shortly after proposed his own version of the theory, calling it "extended cognition" (see, for example, the paper The Extended Mind).

Hutchins' distributed cognition theory explains mental processes by taking as the fundamental unit of analysis "a collection of individuals and artifacts and their relations to each other in a particular work practice".

"DCog" is a specific approach to distributed cognition (distinct from other meanings) which takes a computational perspective towards goal-based activity systems.

The distributed cognition approach uses insights from cultural anthropology, sociology, embodied cognitive science, and the psychology of Lev Vygotsky (cf. cultural-historical psychology). It emphasizes the ways that cognition is off-loaded into the environment through social and technological means. It is a framework for studying cognition rather than a type of cognition. This framework involves the coordination between individuals, artifacts and the environment.

According to Zhang & Norman (1994), the distributed cognition approach has three key components:
 Embodiment of information that is embedded in representations of interaction
 Coordination of enaction among embodied agents
 Ecological contributions to a cognitive ecosystem

DCog studies the "propagation of representational states across media". Mental content is considered to be non-reducible to individual cognition and is more properly understood as off-loaded and extended into the environment, where information is also made available to other agents (Heylighen, Heath, & Overwalle, 2003). It is often understood as an approach in specific opposition to earlier and still prevalent "brain in a vat" models which ignore "situatedness, embodiment and enaction" as key to any cognitive act (Ibid.).

These representation-based frameworks consider distributed cognition as "a cognitive system whose structures and processes are distributed between internal and external representations, across a group of individuals, and across space and time" (Zhang and Patel, 2006). In general terms, they consider a distributed cognition system to have two components: internal and external representations. In their description, internal representations are knowledge and structure in individuals' minds while external representations are knowledge and structure in the external environment (Zhang, 1997b; Zhang and Norman, 1994).

DCog studies the ways that memories, facts, or knowledge is embedded in the objects, individuals, and tools in our environment. DCog is a useful approach for designing the technologically mediated social aspects of cognition by putting emphasis on the individual and his/her environment, and the media channels with which people interact, either in order to communicate with each other, or socially coordinate to perform complex tasks. Distributed cognition views a system of cognition as a set of representations propagated through specific media, and models the interchange of information between these representational media. These representations can be either in the mental space of the participants or external representations available in the environment.

These interactions can be categorized into three distinct types of processes:  
 Cognitive processes may be distributed across the members of a social group.
 Cognitive processes may be distributed in the sense that the operation of the cognitive system involves coordination between internal and external (material or environmental) structure.
 Processes may be distributed through time in such a way that the products of earlier events can transform the nature of related events.

Early research
John Milton Roberts thought that social organization could be seen as cognition through a community . He described the cognitive aspects of a society by looking at the present information and how it moves through the people in the society.

Daniel L. Schwartz (1978) proposed a distribution of cognition through culture and the distribution of beliefs across the members of a society.

In 1998, Mark Perry from Brunel University London explored the problems and the benefits brought by distributed cognition to "understanding the organisation of information within its contexts." He considered that distributed cognition draws from the information processing metaphor of cognitive science where a system is considered in terms of its inputs and outputs and tasks are decomposed into a problem space.  He believed that information should be studied through the representation within the media or artifact that represents the information. Cognition is said to be "socially distributed" when it is applied to demonstrate how interpersonal processes can be used to coordinate activity within a social group.

In 1999, Gavriel Salomon stated that there were two classes of distributive cognition: shared cognition and off-loading. Shared cognition is that which is shared among people through common activity such as conversation where there is a constant change of cognition based on the other person's responses. An example of off-loading would be using a calculator to do arithmetic or a creating a grocery list when going shopping. In that sense, the cognitive duties are off-loaded to a material object.

Later, John Sutton (2006) defined five appropriate domains of investigation for research in Dcog:
 External cultural tools, artifacts, and symbol systems.
 Natural environmental resources.
 Interpersonal and social distribution or scaffolding.
 Embodied capacities and skills.
 Internalized cognitive artifacts.

Applications
The application area of DCog is systems design and implementation in specific work environments. Its main method is field research, going into the workplace and making rigorous observations, e.g. through capturing work performances with video, studying and coding the recorded activities using qualitative research methods to codify the various ways in which cognition is distributed in the local environment, through the social and technical systems with which the workers engage.

Distributed cognition as a theory of learning, i.e. one in which the development of knowledge is attributed to the system of thinking agents interacting dynamically with artifacts, has been widely applied in the field of distance learning, especially in relation to computer-supported collaborative learning (CSCL) and other computer-supported learning tools. For example, in the field of teaching English Composition, Kevin LaGrandeur has argued that CSCL provides a source of common memory, collaborative space, and a cognitive artifact (tool to enhance cognition) that allows students to more easily build effective written compositions via explicit and implicit machine-human collaboration. Distributed cognition illustrates the process of interaction between people and technologies in order to determine how to best represent, store and provide access to digital resources and other artifacts.

Collaborative tagging on the World Wide Web is one of the most recent developments in technological support for distributed cognition. Beginning in 2004 and quickly becoming a standard on websites, collaborative tagging allows users to upload or select materials (e.g. pictures, music files, texts, websites) and associate tags with these materials. Tags can be chosen freely, and are similar to keywords. Other users can then browse through tags; a click on a tag connects a user to similarly tagged materials. Tags furthermore enable tag clouds, which graphically represent the popularity of tags, demonstrating co-occurrence relations between tags and thus jump from one tag to another.

Dcog has also been used to understand learning and communication in clinical settings and to obtain an integrated view of clinical workplace learning. It has been observed how medical actors use and connect gestural practices, along with visual and haptic structures of their own bodies and of artifacts such as technological instruments and computational devices. In so doing they co-construct complex, multimodal representations that go beyond the mental representations usually studied from a cognitive perspective of learning.

Distributed cognition can also be seen through cultures and communities. Learning certain habits or following certain traditions is seen as cognition distributed over a group of people. Exploring distributed cognition through community and culture is one way to understand how it may work.

With the new research that is emerging in this field, the overarching concept of distributed cognition enhances the understanding of interactions between individual human beings and artifacts such as technologies and machines, and complex external environments. This concept has been applied to educational research in the areas of distributed leadership and distributed instruction.

Distributed cognition between internal and external processing has also been used to study problem-solving and Bayesian reasoning. For example, it has been observed that the use of external manipulable materials such as cards and tokens can help improve performance and reduce cognitive bias such as the base-rate fallacy, even among adult problem-solvers, as long as they physically interact with these artefacts. It has also been reported that interacting with tokens can reduce the impact of mathematical anxiety on mental calculation performance and supports insight although the evidence is mixed with regards to the impact of distributing cognition between internal and external processing with regards to insight.

Metaphors and examples
Distributed cognition is seen when using paper and pencil to do a complicated arithmetic problem. The person doing the problem may talk with a friend to clarify the problem, and then must write the partial answers on the paper in order to be able to keep track of all the steps in the calculation. In this example, the parts of distributed cognition are seen in:
 setting up the problem, in collaboration with another person,
 performing manipulation/arithmetic procedures, both in one's head and by writing down resulting partial answers.

The process of working out the answer requires not only the perception and thought of two people, it also requires the use of a tool (paper) to extend an individual's memory. So the intelligence is distributed, both between people, and a person and an object.

Another well-researched site for analyzing distributed cognition and applying the discovered insights towards the design of more optimal systems is aviation, where both cockpits and air traffic control environments have been studied as scenes that technologically and socially distribute cognition through systems of externalized representational media. It is not the cognitive performance and expertise of any one single person or machine that is important for the continued operation or the landing and takeoff of airplanes. The cognition is distributed over the personnel, sensors, and machinery both in the plane and on the ground, including but not limited to the controllers, pilots and crew as a whole.

Hutchins also examined  another scene of distributed cognition within the context of navigating a US navy vessel. In his book on USS Palau, he explains in detail how distributed cognition is manifested through the interaction between crew members as they interpret, process, and transform information into various representational states in order to safely navigate the ship. In this functional unit, crew members (e.g. pelorus operators, bearing takers, plotters, and the ship's captain) play the role of actors who transform information into different representational states (i.e. triangulation, landmark sightings, bearings, and maps). In this context, navigation is embodied through the combined efforts of actors in the functional unit.

In his study on process, representation and task world, Mark Perry demonstrated how distributed cognition analysis can be conducted in a field study. His example was design analysis in Civil engineering. In this work, he showed how an information processing approach can be applied by carrying a detailed analysis of the background of the study - goals and resources, inputs and outputs, representations and processes, and transformational activity, "how information was transformed from the design drawings and site onto tables of measurements (different representations)" and then onto "a graphical representation" which provided a clearer demonstration of the relationship between the two data sets.

Quotes
On educational psychology:

On cognitive science:

See also 

 Activity theory
 Civic intelligence
 Collaborative innovation networks
 Collective intelligence
 Distributed language
 Distributed leadership
 Extended mind

 Collective consciousness
 Global brain
 List of thought processes
 Situated cognition
 Social cognition

References

Further reading 

 
 
 
  
 
 
 
 
 
 
 
 
 
 
 

Cognitive science
Collective intelligence
Enactive cognition